Adelaide Peak is a 7,300-foot-elevation (2,200 meter) mountain summit located in the Olympic Mountains, in Jefferson County of Washington state. It is situated within Olympic National Park, and is set within the Daniel J. Evans Wilderness. It is part of The Needles range, which is a subset of the Olympic range. The nearest higher peak is Mount Clark,  to the south, and Mount Walkinshaw rises  to the north-northwest. The peak is in the rain shadow of the Olympic Range, resulting in less precipitation than Mount Olympus and the western Olympics receive. Precipitation runoff from the mountain drains east into Royal Creek, and west into Gray Wolf River, which are both within the drainage basin of the Dungeness River. Topographic relief is significant as the east aspect rises 2,600 feet (793 m) above Royal Creek in less than one mile.

History

The first ascent of the peak was made in 1944 by Adel and William Degenhardt. The mountain's name commemorates Adelaide Degenhardt, who made that first ascent. The mountain's name was submitted for consideration in 1958 by Kent Heathershaw and Robert McKee to recognize the Degenhardts for pioneering the Needles area as a climbing area. This landform's name has not been officially adopted by the U.S. Board on Geographic Names, so the mountain is not labeled on USGS maps.

The husband-wife climbing duo also made the first ascent of nearby Sundial the same year. William Degenhardt is the namesake of Mount Degenhardt located in North Cascades National Park.

Climate

Adelaide Peak is located in the marine west coast climate zone of western North America. Most weather fronts originate in the Pacific Ocean, and travel east toward the Olympic Mountains. As fronts approach, they are forced upward by the peaks of the Olympic Range, causing them to drop their moisture in the form of rain or snowfall (Orographic lift). As a result, the Olympics experience high precipitation, especially during the winter months in the form of snowfall. During winter months, weather is usually cloudy, but due to high pressure systems over the Pacific Ocean that intensify during summer months, there is often little or no cloud cover during the summer. Because of maritime influence, snow tends to be wet and heavy, resulting in avalanche danger. The months July through September offer the most favorable weather for climbing Adelaide Peak.

Geology

The Olympic Mountains are composed of obducted clastic wedge material and oceanic crust, primarily Eocene sandstone, turbidite, and basaltic oceanic crust. The mountains were sculpted during the Pleistocene era by erosion and glaciers advancing and retreating multiple times.

See also

 Olympic Mountains
 Geology of the Pacific Northwest

References

External links
 

Mountains of Washington (state)
Olympic Mountains
Mountains of Jefferson County, Washington
Landforms of Olympic National Park
North American 2000 m summits